Coronidium scorpioides, commonly known as the button everlasting, is a perennial herbaceous shrub in the family Asteraceae found in Australia. Previously known as Helichrysum scorpioides, it was placed in the newly described genus Coronidium in 2008.

Taxonomy and naming
Jacques Labillardière described the button everlasting as Helichrysum scorpioides in 1806 from a specimen collected in Tasmania.  The large genus Helichrysum was long recognised as polyphyletic and many of its members have been transferred to new genera. Botanist Paul Graham Wilson erected the new genus Coronidium for 17 species of daisy of the eastern states of Australia, and it was given its new name of C. scorpioides in 2008. Wilson suspects there may be several species within C. scorpioides as currently defined, but deferred formally splitting them when revising the genus.

Description
The woolly stems rise vertically and are unbranched, and are topped by the yellow flowerheads in spring.

Distribution and habitat
Coronidium scorpioides is found from the Gibraltar Range in northern New South Wales, south through the eastern part of the state into Victoria and southeastern South Australia as well as Tasmania. It grows on heavier more fertile soils, such as brown clay or clay-loam, derived from basalt, or sandstone-shale, in open forest under such trees as narrow-leaved peppermint (Eucalyptus radiata), Sydney peppermint  (E. piperita), brown barrel (E. fastigata), grey gum (E. punctata), manna gum (E. viminalis) or Blaxland's stringybark (E. blaxlandii), or in more open woodland under scribbly gum (Eucalyptus sclerophylla) and narrow-leaved apple (Angophora bakeri).

Ecology
Coronidium scorpioides resprouts after bushfire, some plants taking as little as 16 weeks to flower.

References

scorpioides
Flora of New South Wales
Flora of Victoria (Australia)
Garden plants of Australia
Taxa named by Jacques Labillardière
Taxa named by Paul G. Wilson